Wilson "Bill" Livingood (born October 1, 1936), a 33-year veteran of the United States Secret Service, was elected Sergeant at Arms of the United States House of Representatives on January 4, 1995, for the 104th Congress, and served through the 112th Congress. Livingood was the 35th person to hold the post since the U.S. House of Representatives first met in New York City in 1789.

References

External links

1936 births
Living people
Michigan State University alumni
People from Philadelphia
Sergeants at Arms of the United States House of Representatives
United States Secret Service agents